Vaishali district is a district in the Indian state of Bihar. It is a part of Tirhut division. Vaishali is known for being the birthplace of Mahavira of the Jain religion. Hajipur, its largest city and district headquarters, is known for its banana forest. The district is connected via the NH-77 and NH-322 highways, which connect the state capital Patna, the division headquarters Muzaffarpur, and the eastward district Samastipur.

History

Ancient Vaishali

According to legend, Vaishali derives its name from King Vishal, a son of Ikshvaku who founded the city. Vaishali was the capital of the vibrant Licchavi republic and was closely associated with the early histories of both Buddhism and Jainism. In that period, Vaishali was an ancient metropolis and the capital city of the republic of the Vajji confederation of Mithila, which covered most of the Himalayan Gangetic region of present-day Bihar. Magadh rulers of the Shishunaga dynasty shifted its capital from Pataliputra to Vaishali.

Post-Independence
Vaishali became a district when it was split from Muzaffarpur in 1972.

Geography

Economy
In 2006 the Ministry of Panchayati Raj named Vaishali one of the country's 250 most backward districts (out of a total of 640). It is one of the 38 districts in Bihar currently receiving funds from the Backward Regions Grant Fund Programme (BRGF).

Demographics

According to the 2011 census Vaishali district has a population of 3,495,021, roughly equal to the nation of Panama or the US state of Connecticut. This gives it a ranking of 86th in India (out of a total of 640). Its population growth rate over the decade 2001-2011 was 28.58%. Vaishali has a sex ratio of 892 females for every 1000 males, and a literacy rate of 66.60%. 6.67% of the population lives in urban areas. Scheduled Castes and Scheduled Tribes make up 21.12% and 0.07% of the population respectively.

Languages 

At the time of the 2011 Census of India, 95.09% of the population in the district spoke Hindi and 4.80% Urdu as their first language. 69.88% of the population recorded their language as 'Other' under Hindi, while Hindi itself was only reported by 25.10%. The dialect of the region is Bajjika, variously regarded as a dialect of Maithili language.

Flora and fauna

Politics 
  

|}

See also
List of tehsils in Vaishali district
List of villages in Vaishali district
Vaishali (ancient city)

References

External links
 Vaishali district, Official website
 Vaishali district at Govt. of Bihar, website.
 Official Website of Tirhut Division

 
Tirhut division
Districts of Bihar
States and territories established in 1972
1972 establishments in Bihar